Wooroonden State School, was a one-teacher state school in Wooroonden, South Burnett Region, Queensland, Australia.

History
On 14 October 1918, Woroon State School opened on land given to the government by Oscar Sidney Wallace, a section of whose property at the corner of Bradleys Road and Webbers Bridge Road, was a convenient location for a school. It became Woroonden State School in 1925 and closed at the end of 1963. A school bus run that had already begun for secondary school students, then transported both primary and secondary students into Murgon schools. After the closure of the school the grounds were renamed the Hughie Campbell Memorial Park.

Woroonden was officially renamed Wooroonden in 2002, to end many years of both spellings being used.

References

Educational institutions established in 1918
Schools in Wide Bay–Burnett
Defunct schools in Queensland
1918 establishments in Australia